The Volta Tour was a tour by the singer Björk that focused on her album, Volta. Overall, 48 songs were done on the tour focusing on many tracks from Debut through to Vespertine, though mostly from Medúlla and Volta, the former of which did not receive its own tour. The tour band consisted of  drummer Chris Corsano, musician Mark Bell (who also accompanied Björk on the Homogenic tour), pianist Jónas Sen (who played celeste on the tracks Gratitude and Cetacea on the Drawing Restraint 9 soundtrack), musician Damian Taylor and a 10 piece female Icelandic brass section. Many of the songs evolved considerably during the tour, including "Innocence" which was re-done so as to incorporate brass elements. Live performances of the track "Declare Independence" made heavy use of the ReacTable, an electro-acoustic music instrument with a tabletop Tangible User Interface, which is played by Damian Taylor. The Tenori-on was used heavily in performances of "Who Is It". A live DVD and CD of the Volta tour was released as part of Voltaïc. The tour was Björk's first in four years and saw her play countries that she had not played in over ten years.

Background 

After some rumours started circulating during 2006, in January 2007, through Björk's official website, it was announced that a new album, the follow-up to her 2004 record Medúlla was being ultimated.  Collaborators on the latest output included Timbaland, with whom Björk had collaborated on three songs, Antony and the Johnsons lead singer Anohni, drummers Chris Corsano and Brian Chippendale, African musicians Toumani Diabaté and Konono N°1, Chinese pipa player Min Xiaofen, Mark Bell, who had collaborated with Björk on Homogenic and played with her during the Homogenic Tour and Icelandic poet and long-time collaborator Sjón, who had penned a song for the album. Along with the album, a new tour was confirmed to take place in the following months. On January 22, 2007, the first show was confirmed to take place at Coachella Festival, which she already headlined in 2002. Three days later, Björk's performance at Glastonbury Festival was announced. However, it was specified by Glastonbury chief Michael Eavis that she would not be headlining. Between January and February, performances at Roskilde Festival, Open'er Festival, Paléo Festival, Rock Werchter and Sasquatch! Music Festival were confirmed. The first North American leg was announced on March 19, with shows at Radio City Music Hall, Red Rocks Amphitheatre and Shoreline Amphitheatre.

Before the start of the tour, Björk performed three songs at a benefit concert at Club NASA in Reykjavík on April 1 for FORMA, an Icelandic organisation which deals with people who have eating disorders. Tour rehearsals began shortly before this performance in Iceland. The tour band consisted of Bell on beats, Corsano on drums, Canadian producer Damian Taylor on electronics, Icelandic-Chinese classical pianist Jónas Sen (who played celeste on the tracks "Gratitude" and "Cetacea" on Drawing Restraint 9) on keyboards and a 10-piece, all-female brass band from Reykjavík called the Wonderbrass. The Tour started on April 9, 2007, with a concert at Laugardalshöll in Reykjavík.

Further dates were announced in the Netherlands, Spain, France, Italy, Ireland and Scotland. The second North American leg, which was announced in July, featured a performance at Madison Square Garden, while the South American dates were confirmed in October. It was since 1997 (during the Homogenic Tour) that Björk didn't perform in South America. During October, 2007, the first dates for 2008 were confirmed, with Björk playing seven shows in Australia and New Zealand for the Big Day Out and Sydney Festival. It was the first time since 1996 that Björk had played in Oceania. Björk had to cancel an appearance in Sydney due to "swelling of the vocal chords [sic]". Further dates were announced in Japan, China, Hong Kong, South Korea, Indonesia and United Kingdom. A show in Sheffield was rescheduled due to health issues. Later appearances included shows at Melt! Festival, Festival Sudoeste, Riga, Ola Festival in Spain, Helsinki, Vilnius, Paris, Verona, Rome, Athens and Istanbul. It was rumoured that the singer would perform in Israel for the first time since 1996 (during the Post Tour), but no such event happened. Moreover, Björk had to cancel appearances in Helsinki and Sheffield because of problems with her throat and vocal chords. An appearance at Wild in the Country, which was promoted as an exclusive UK festival appearance, was cancelled after Björk had called the event "volatile" and cited problems with staging and lighting. The whole event was cancelled thereafter. On June 18, 2008, it was announced that Björk and Sigur Rós would join and organise a free concert called "Náttúra" in Reykjavík along with Icelandic author Andri Snær Magnason, to raise awareness about the impact of Aluminium smelting activity on Iceland's landscape. After the end of the tour, an acoustic showcase took place at Langholtskirkja in Reykjavík, in which different songs from the tour were performed alongside new arrangements of old songs, including "It's Oh So Quiet".

Controversies 

Björk has used live performances of "Declare Independence" to declare political support for various causes, often to some controversy. At two concerts in Tokyo, Japan she showed her support for Kosovo's declaration of independence. When her upcoming performance at the 2008 Serbian EXIT Festival was cancelled, Björk suggested that "Maybe a Serb attended my concert [in Tokyo] and called home, and therefore the concert in Novi Sad was cancelled." The organizer behind the EXIT Festival denied that Björk's cancellation from the festival was because of her song dedication to Kosovo; that it was actually their inability to guarantee the safety of her fans. Björk's management maintained that the cancellation was because of the dedication, claiming that they had received an email from EXIT Festival saying that they would only allow the concert to go ahead if Björk's management "denied that Björk has ever [dedicated the song to Kosovo]". On March 7, 2008 EXIT festival organiser Bojan Boscovic changed his position and told NME that Björk has an "open invitation" to play at the festival. Björk's dedicating of "Declare Independence" to the Faroe Islands caused some minor controversy in the country.

At a concert in Shanghai, China on March 2, 2008 Björk shouted "Tibet, Tibet!" three times followed by "Raise your flag!" four times during the finale performance of "Declare Independence". Immediately there was an 'uneasy atmosphere' and fans left the venue quickly, and internet forums such as Tianya fielded many negative comments on her statement. China's Ministry of Culture issued a statement denouncing Björk's outburst, and warned that she would be banned from future appearances in China if she repeated such behavior. In an interview, Björk said that she did not "[plan] a trip to China with the purpose of... propaganda" and that Chinese officials "sensationalized" her performance. On July 17, 2008 the Chinese Ministry of Culture announced that artistic groups who "threaten national unity" or "whip up ethnic hatred" among other things during live events would be banned from performing. Fans of Oasis and Bob Dylan, who had previously performed in Tibetan Freedom Concerts, blamed the new regulations for their subsequent denials of permission to perform in Chinese venues.

Many of the live performances from the current tour can be viewed on the video sharing website YouTube, shot by people in the audience. However, Björk has voiced her dislike of fans recording video/taking pictures (with flash) at her concerts using their mobile phones ("little cameras"), stating that it affects her ability to perform. On 13 January 2008, Björk attacked a photographer who had photographed her arrival at Auckland International Airport in New Zealand for her scheduled performance at the Big Day Out festival. Björk allegedly tore the photographer's shirt down the back, and in the process she fell to the ground. Neither the photographer nor his employer, The New Zealand Herald, lodged a formal complaint, and Auckland police did not investigate further.

Broadcasts and recordings 

Several performances from the tour were streamed online. Björk's performance at Coachella was streamed on AT&T Webcasts the day of the show. NPR and WNYC offered a webcast of the show at United Palace Theater, which is still available to stream. The singer's show at Glastonbury Festival was broadcast on BBC Four. A partial footage from Roskilde Festival was broadcast by MTV. Björk and Sigur Rós headlined free concert "Náttúra" was live streamed by Nat Geo Music.

On June 25, 2007, it was announced on pianist Jonas Sen tour blog, that a recording session at Olympic Studios in London took place with the band earlier that day.  The recording was officially confirmed by Björk's team three months later, on September 7, 2007. It was stated that the recording was intended for a "live session album". When Björk's concert at Olympia in Paris was announced, it was specified that it would be recorded. The acoustic showcase at Langholtskirkja in Reykjavík, which had taken place just after the tour had ended, was also filmed. On January 31, 2009, it was announced that a box set called Voltaïc, which would contain the London live session and both the Paris and Reykjavik shows, along with music videos and remixes, was to be released during the year. The collection, originally bound to a March, 2008, release, saw many delays due to a manufacturing error which led to 20,000 copies of the box-set having to be destroyed, and with a remanufacture necessary, Björk decided to make changes to the track listing resulting in four songs being cut from the live DVD. Towards the end of April 2009 Universal Europe accidentally shipped their Deluxe Edition copies of Voltaïc early. A statement released by One Little Indian confirmed that the projected release date was meant to be June 2009 as they wanted all three versions of Voltaïc to be available upon official release. However, UK-based music retailer CD Wow was found to be for a brief period selling un-cut copies of the box set, before its official release. These copies, which had allegedly been destroyed, were manufactured in Malaysia - and as such contained more tracks than the other released (cut) editions. Voltaïc eventually enjoyed its full official release on 23 June 2009. A preview of the DVD was released on YouTube on June 16, 2009, while footage from "Declare Independence" from Paris and "Sonnets/Unrealities XI" from Reykjavík were premiered by Pitchfork and Rolling Stone, respectively. Voltaïc was screened at fifteen theatres throughout the USA to coincide with the North American release, and throughout July 2009 the concert was also shown twice weekly at the Háskólabíó theatre in Reykjavík. Björk herself was present at the first screening.

Opening acts 

 Hot Chip
 Konono N°1
 Spank Rock
 Ghostigital
 Joanna Newsom
 M.I.A.
 Klaxons
 Ratatat
 Santogold
 Leila Arab
 Cosmos
 Jurga Šeduikytė

Songs performed

Tour dates

Festivals and miscellaneous performances

Cancellations and rescheduled shows

Awards and nominations

Meteor Ireland Music Awards

|-
| 2008 || Volta Tour live at Electric Picnic || Best International Live Performance ||

References

External links
Volta Tour Summary at old.bjork.com
2007 gigography at bjork.com
2008 gigography at bjork.com

2007 concert tours
2008 concert tours
Björk concert tours